The fifth season of the long-running Australian outback drama McLeod's Daughters began airing on 9 February 2005 and concluded on 23 November 2005 with a total of 32 episodes.

This is the first season where the opening credits are changed. They now feature both the actor's or actress' name and the character's name. Also, the theme song is now a remixed version of the original, still performed by Rebecca Lavelle.

Bridie Carter (Tess), Simmone Jade Mackinnon (Stevie), Aaron Jeffery (Alex), Brett Tucker (Dave), and Michala Banas (Kate) return as main cast members. Myles Pollard (Nick) returns as a main cast member before his character leaves for Argentina. He will return in the sixth season as a recurring character when it is discovered Nick is still alive. Sonia Todd returns as a recurring character for several episodes after being a main character during the first four seasons. Jonny Pasvolsky joins the main cast in the middle of season as Rob Shelton, the new overseer on Killarney.

Cast

Main.
 Bridie Carter as Tess Silverman McLeod Ryan
 Simmone Jade Mackinnon as Stevie Hall
 Rachael Carpani as Jodi Fountain
 Aaron Jeffery as Alex Ryan
 Myles Pollard as Nick Ryan (episodes 1—16)
 Brett Tucker as Dave Brewer
 Michala Banas as Kate Manfredi
 Jonny Pasvolsky as Rob Shelton (episode 16—)

Recurring
 Sonia Todd as Meg Fountain
 John Jarratt as Terry Dodge
 Marshall Napier as Harry Ryan
 Dean O'Gorman as Luke Morgan 
Kathryn Hartman as Sally Clemments
 Inge Hornstra as Sandra Ryan
 Henry Nixon as Greg Dawson
 Zoe Naylor as Regan McLeod
 Doris Younane as Moira Doyle

Guest
 Rhys Muldoon as Jeremy Quaid
 Tara Morice as Michelle Hall-Smith
 Basia A'Hern as Rose Hall-Smith
 Luke Jacobz as Patrick Brewer
Sophie Cleary as Catriona Bradfield

Episodes

Reception

Ratings
On average, the fifth season was watched by 1.35 million viewers, down 170,000 viewers from the previous season. It was the most-watched Australian drama of 2005, and ranked at #6 for its fifth season.

Award nominations
The fifth season of McLeod's Daughters received six nominations at the 2006 Logie Awards.
 Gold Logie Award for Most Popular Personality on Australian Television (Bridie Carter)
 Logie Award for Most Popular Actress (Bridie Carter)
 Logie Award for Most Popular Actor (Aaron Jeffery)
 Logie Award for Most Popular New Male Talent (Jonny Pasvolsky)
 Logie Award for Most Popular Drama Series
 Logie Award for Most Outstanding Drama Series

Home media

References

 www.tv.com

External links
 McLeod's Daughters Official Website

McLeod's Daughters seasons
2005 Australian television seasons